Tinkham Mountain is located in the Lewis Range, Glacier National Park in the U.S. state of Montana. This mountain's name was officially adopted in 1929 by the United States Board on Geographic Names to recognize Lieutenant Abiel W. Tinkham, the first white man to cross the Continental Divide at what would later become Glacier National Park.

See also
 Mountains and mountain ranges of Glacier National Park (U.S.)

References

Mountains of Flathead County, Montana
Tinkham Mountain
Lewis Range
Mountains of Montana